The PLK Finals MVP award is handed out to the best player in the Polish Basketball League Finals, the final series of the highest Polish basketball league.

Winners

 There was no awarding in the 2019–20, because the season was cancelled due to the coronavirus pandemic in Europe.

Multiple honors

Player nationality

Teams

References

External links
Polska Liga Koszykówki - Official Site 
Polish League at Eurobasket.com

Basketball most valuable player awards
Finals MVP